Northern & Scottish Airways was a regional airline established in Glasgow in 1934. It was taken over in 1937, eventually becoming part of British European Airways.

History

Formation
The potential of running scheduled air services to the Western Isles of Scotland was successfully demonstrated in 1933 by a bus operator from Ayr, John Sword, with his Midland & Scottish Air Ferries company. After that operation was suddenly stopped in the summer of 1934, another bus company manager, George Nicholson, took on the challenge.

On 1 July 1934 he formed his company, Northern Airways, and on 1 August started testing the market by operating scheduled flights from Newcastle (Cramlington Aerodrome) to the Isle of Man (Hall Caine Airport) via Carlisle (Kingstown Municipal Airport) in his De Havilland DH.84 Dragon G-ACFG. Despite stopping the experiment on 30 September, on 21 November he renamed his airline Northern & Scottish Airways Ltd (N&SA), and on 1 December 1934 with the same aircraft started a service from Glasgow Renfrew Airport to Campbeltown (Kintyre Airport) and Islay (Port Ellen, also known as Duich or Glenegedale), a route that had been pioneered by John Sword's Midland & Scottish Air Ferries.

Operations
The new route made a slow start, but by the following summer, had grown to two daily flights, and on 17 May 1935 he started a service between Glasgow and the Isle of Man (Hall Caine Airport). On 1 January 1935, Nicholson had agreed a contract with Argyll County Council to provide air ambulance services. Nicholson appointed David Barclay as chief pilot that year.

These activities were being watched by Clive Pearson, head of the powerful investment group Whitehall Securities Corporation, who had already started Spartan Air Lines and was looking to link it to the north of England and to Scotland. N&SA fitted the bill, so on 23 May 1935, Pearson took control of N&SA, leaving Nicholson as its head. In June, Pearson took a majority holding in Highland Airways, which served the Scottish Northern Isles, thus almost completing his coverage of Scottish air routes.

Services continued as before, now also bolstered with Spartan Cruiser airliners brought in from Spartan Air Lines, and the two main routes. Isle of Man to Glasgow, and Glasgow to Campbeltown and Islay were operated as part of the United Airways schedule, United being Pearson's new airline operating in the north of England with a link to Spartan at London’s Heston Aerodrome.

In September 1935 Pearson created British Airways Ltd by combining Spartan Air Lines, United Airways, and the previously independent Hillman's Airways. N&SA was kept out of the new company, bur the two co-operated, and aircraft were transferred between them, N&SA taking several of their De Havilland DH.89 Dragon Rapides to provide extra capacity.

On 5 December 1935 David Barclay flew Dragon G-ACFG on another new route, to Glen Brittle, on the Isle of Skye, extending the following month to Askernish on South Uist, and again in February 1936 to Sollas on North Uist. The service ran every day except Sundays, operating from Renfrew in a circular fashion, with Monday, Wednesday and Friday flights calling at Skye, North then South Uist, and Tuesday, Thursday and Saturday flights calling at South then North Uist, and Skye.

During 1936 further additions were made to these routes with on-demand services from North and South Uist to Barra and Benbecula, and from North Uist to Harris on the Isle of Lewis and Harris. 

On 1 July 1936, Pearson took full control of N&SA, but still kept it separate from British Airways. The company kept its identity and George Nicholson was retained as the managing director. N&SA took over all of British Airways’ internal routes from Liverpool northwards, and expanded its air ambulance work with a new contract with Inverness County Council. In early 1937, N&SA established a radio station at North Uist, making navigation, weather reporting and general communication much easier.

Demise
On 12 August 1937 Pearson formed one large airline called Scottish Airways. He brought in investment from LMS Railway, and from David MacBrayne, the Scottish ferry company which established Western Isles Airways as its investment tool. They brought N&SA and Highland Airways into the new airline. To avoid confusion with Scottish Airways the company was renamed Northern Airways Limited on 6 September 1937 and it became a non-functional holding company. The company was finally liquidated when British Airways merged with Imperial Airways in November 1939.

On 2 August 1938 Northern Airways completely lost its identity, becoming the Southern Division of Scottish Airways, still based in Glasgow and with Nicholson still in charge. Northern Airways Ltd went into voluntary liquidation in November 1939.

On 1 February 1947, in the process of nationalising all British scheduled airlines, the new British European Airways (BEA) took over Scottish Airways, and on 30 September 1948 Nicholson was made redundant. He died in South Africa in 1950.

Routes
From timetable dated 1 July 1936
 Renfrew — Skye — North Uist (on-demand to Harris) — Benbecula — South Uist (on demand to Barra) — Renfrew
 Renfrew — Campbeltown — Islay (on demand to Tiree)
 Renfrew — Isle of Man
 Renfrew — Belfast (Newtownards)
 Isle of Man — Belfast
 Isle of Man — Liverpool (Speke)
 Isle of Man — Blackpool (Stanley Park)
 Isle of Man — Carlisle (Kingstown)

Fleet list

The livery was overall silver with blue lettering and trim.

Accidents and incidents
The following aircraft were involved in accidents or incidents while with N&SA: G-ACVT, G-ACYL, G-ADBU and G-ADEM. See Fleet list above for details.

See also
 List of defunct airlines of the United Kingdom

Footnotes

References

Bibliography

Defunct airlines of the United Kingdom
Airlines established in 1934
Aviation in Scotland
Defunct airlines of Scotland